The Shooter is a 1997 American Western film directed by Fred Olen Ray (credited as Ed Raymond) and starring Michael Dudikoff.

Plot synopsis
Michael Atherton stands up to the unfriendly and controlling family that runs the small, western town he lives in and ends up unheroically beaten up and left for dead. By luck, he is saved by a prostitute attacked by the same group of desperados.

Cast

Michael Dudikoff as Michael Atherton
Randy Travis as Kyle Tapert
Valerie Wildman as Wendy
Andrew Stevens as Jacob Finch / Narrator
William Smith as Jerry Krants
Robert Donavan as Mayor Pete Sayers
Eric Lawson as Paul
Hoke Howell as Duncan
Libby George as Gina
Cal Bartlett as Sheriff

Reception

Despite no Rotten Tomatoes approval rating and a Want-To-See score of 29%, The Shooter received positive reviews from critics and audiences. Karina Montgomery of "rec.arts.movies.reviews" called it "a meat and potatoes kind of film, a good time. You can find plot holes, but to comment on them would be petty in light of the rest of the film's merits working with them." Super Reviewer Brody Manson said "I was NOT expecting to like this western as much as I did but It had that old school western feel and it was action packed from start to finish."

External links

1997 films
1997 Western (genre) films
Films directed by Fred Olen Ray
American Western (genre) films
1990s English-language films
1990s American films